Lippard is a ghost town in Rush County, Kansas, United States.

History
Initially known as Howe, was issued a post office in 1882. The post office was renamed Lippard in 1886, then moved to Liebenthal in 1891.

References

Further reading

External links
 Rush County maps: Current, Historic, KDOT

Former populated places in Rush County, Kansas
Former populated places in Kansas